The first season of Farm franchise of Slovenia was aired in 2007 by POP TV. 12 contestants compete for a grand prize 50,000 € ten weeks. Špela Močnik, radio host was named the hostess of Kmetija 1. After 10 weeks of the show only allies Daša and Bilijana remained in the game. During the live final, one week after the daily episodes ended, Daša won 2 duals and Bilijana won only 1, so Daša become the winner of the farm and 50,000 Euro.
 There were two contestants that leave the show out of regular. Dejan leave in week 2 due to medical reasons. Simon was ejected due to while he was preparing for dual he should stay in the isolated house whole night, but he and Jurij (that should also stay in his isolated house) came to main house. And after producers find out about it he was ejected.
In week 7 lightning hits the isolated house while Špela was in it. After she was hospitalized she decided to return and fight to continue with life on the farm. But after she beat Adrijana she was lining her final week on the farm, because after one week Daša eliminated her.
 During the show there was a showmance going on between Adrijana and Michael.
In first season, Kmetija was on air 5 episodes per week. Over season there was no live episodes. There were 5 episodes per week; on Tuesday, Wednesday and Thursday were broadcast at 10:00 pm CET and in Friday and Saturday were broadcast at 9:00 pm CET. This kin of episodes were aired over 10 weeks as much as season was recorded. In 11th week there were 4 live talk shows and one live finale in Saturday. In 11th week were episodes aired at 8:00 pm CET. All episodes were broadcast by POP TV and lest 60min with commercials.

Contestants

Nominations

External links
Page with all information of Kmetija 1 and 2.

The Farm (franchise)
2007 Slovenian television seasons